During the 1991–92 English football season, Coventry City F.C. competed in the Football League First Division.

Season summary
In the 1991–92 season, Coventry had a poor start to the season and Butcher was sacked in January 1992 after just one year in charge. Don Howe took over as interim manager until the end of the season and managed to keep Coventry narrowly away from relegation and the club took its place in the inaugural FA Premier League.

Final league table

 Pld = Matches ; W = Matches won; D = Matches drawn; L = Matches lost; F = Goals for; A = Goals against; GD = Goal difference; Pts = Points

Results
Coventry City's score comes first

Legend

Football League First Division

FA Cup

League Cup

Full Members Cup

Squad

Transfers

In

Out

Transfers in:  £460,000
Transfers out:  £515,000
Total spending:  £55,000

References

Coventry City F.C. seasons
Coventry City